Smartzee is a French rapper born in Benin.

Biography
Smartzee became known to the general public due to his feature on the single "Et c’est parti" of French R&B singer Nâdiya. The single reached the top 5 French rankings for 22 weeks. He remade a duet in 2005 with Nâdiya for the song "All these words" which reached the 2nd place. Smartzee released its first solo album, The Wishmaster, in December 2008.

Discography

Albums
2008 - The Wishmaster

Singles
2004 - "Et c'est parti..." (Nâdiya feat. Smartzee), #2 France
2006 - "Tous ces mots" (Nâdiya feat. Smartzee), #2 France
2006 - "Roc" (Nâdiya), #2 France
2006 - "It's On" (feat. Gilles Luka)
2007 - "Comment Oublier" (Nâdiya ), #2 France
2009 - "Diggin It" (feat. DJ Oriska) Ocean Drive
2009 - "Your Man" (feat. DJ Oriska) Ocean Drive

References

External links
Discogs

Living people
American rappers
French rappers
French people of Beninese descent
French people of American descent
21st-century American rappers
1980 births